Idiogramma is a genus of wasp. It is the only extant genus in the tribe Idiogrammatini.

Species include:

 Idiogramma comstockii 
 Idiogramma elbakyanae 
 ''Idiogramma euryops

References

Further reading
 

Ichneumonidae genera